Pourthiaea is a genus of plants in the rose family (Rosaceae).

Its native range is East Asia and Indo-China. It is found in the regions of Assam, Bangladesh, (north-central, south-central and  southeastern) China, East Himalaya, Japan, Korea, Laos, Myanmar, Taiwan, Thailand, Tibet and Vietnam.

It was later introduced into the American states of Connecticut, Delaware, District of Columbia, New Hampshire, New Jersey, New York, Ohio, Pennsylvania and Washington.

The genus name of Pourthiaea is in honour of J. A. Pourthié (1830–1866), a French clergyman and also missionary in Korea. 
It was first described and published in Nouv. Arch. Mus. Hist. Nat. Vol.10 on page 146 in 1874.

Known species
According to Kew;

References

Rosaceae genera
Plants described in 1845
Flora of China
Flora of Eastern Asia
Flora of Assam (region)
Flora of East Himalaya
Flora of Indo-China
Rosaceae
Taxa named by Joseph Decaisne